Breitscheid is an Ortsgemeinde – a municipality belonging to a Verbandsgemeinde, a kind of collective municipality – in the Mainz-Bingen district in Rhineland-Palatinate, Germany.

Geography

Location
Breitscheid lies in the Hunsrück between Koblenz and Bad Kreuznach. It belongs to the Verbandsgemeinde of Rhein-Nahe, whose seat is in Bingen am Rhein, although that town is not within its bounds. The placename comes from the Middle High German breit and -scheid: “wooded ridge”.

Politics

Municipal council
The council is made up of 5 council members who were elected by majority vote in a municipal election held on 2 March 2008.

Coat of arms
The municipality's arms might be described thus: Per pale argent a cross sable and gules in chief sinister a mullet of six, and in base a mound royal ensigned with a cross crosslet Or.

Economy and infrastructure

Transport
Autobahn A 61 can be reached after a drive of roughly 10 km.

References

External links

 

Municipalities in Rhineland-Palatinate
Mainz-Bingen